Throughout the history of the United States Congress, some members were elected either as representatives and/or senators from more than one U.S. state at different times in their career.

Multiple states in the House

Multiple states in the Senate
Only two senators have represented more than one state.
James Shields uniquely served terms in the US Senate for three states; representing Illinois (1849–55), Minnesota (1858–59), and 20 years later he was appointed by the State of Missouri for a term expiring in just six weeks (1879). He was a Democrat.
Waitman T. Willey was a Restored Government of Virginia Senator (1861–1863) who helped create West Virginia. He was then appointed as one of the new state's first two senators (1863–1871). He was a Unionist until 1865 and a Republican thereafter.

One state in the House, another in the Senate

Territories and states
 William Henry Harrison – the future president of the United States was a delegate to the 6th United States Congress from Northwest Territory (1799–1800), resigning to become territorial Governor of Indiana. He returned to Congress first as a representative from Ohio's 1st congressional district (1816–19), and then serving an incomplete term as senator for Ohio (1825–28), resigning to become U.S. Minister Plenipotentiary to Gran Colombia. He was a Whig.
 James M. Cavanaugh – represented Minnesota (1858–59) as a representative and then Montana Territory (1867–71) as a delegate. He was a Democrat.
 Stephen Benton Elkins – represented New Mexico Territory (1873–77) as a delegate and later West Virginia (1895–1911) as a senator. He was a Republican.
 John Noble Goodwin – represented Maine as a representative (1861–63) and later Arizona Territory as a delegate (1866–76). He was also first governor of the Territory of Arizona. He was a Republican.
 George Wallace Jones – was a delegate from Michigan Territory (1835–37) until Michigan was created as a State. He continued representing the remaining renamed Wisconsin Territory as a delegate (1837–39). Later, after Iowa was carved from the Wisconsin Territory and subsequently admitted to the union, he became one of the first senators from Iowa (1848–59). He was a Democrat.
 Richard Cunningham McCormick  – represented Arizona Territory (1869–75) and later New York as a representative (1895–97). He was a Unionist as a delegate and a Republican as a representative.
 Henry Hastings Sibley – represented Wisconsin Territory (1848–49) and later Minnesota Territory as a delegate (1849–53). He was a Democrat.
 Jesse B. Thomas – represented Indiana Territory (1808–09) as a delegate and later Illinois (1818–1829) as a senator. He was initially a Democratic-Republican, but became an Anti-Jacksonian while senator.
 William H. Wallace – represented Washington Territory (1861–63) and later Idaho Territory as a delegate (1864–65). He was a Republican.

References

Multiple states
United States